Christ III is an anonymous Old English religious poem which forms the last part of Christ, a poetic triad found at the beginning of the Exeter Book. Christ III is found on fols. 20b–32a and constitutes lines 867–1664 of Christ in Krapp and Dobbie's Anglo-Saxon Poetic Records edition. The poem is concerned with the Second Coming of Christ (parousia) and the Last Judgment.

Sample
This passage, about fire engulfing the world at Judgement Day, gives a modern English translation of Christ III, lines 993–1013 (in the line-numbering of the Anglo-Saxon Poetic Records):

Other Old English eschatological poems
Blickling Homily nos. 7 and 10
Judgement Day I
Judgement Day II

Editions and translations
Krapp, George Philip, and Dobbie, E. V. K. (eds.) (1936) The Exeter Book. (The Anglo-Saxon Poetic Records; 3.) New York: Columbia U. P.
Bradley, S. A. J. (tr.) (1982) Anglo-Saxon Poetry: an anthology of Old English poems in prose translation. London: Dent

References

External links

 Apocalyptic Ideas in Old English Literature
 The Old English poems, Christ I-III
 A Modern English translation (PDF), by Charles W. Kennedy. From "In Parentheses".

Old English poems